Wyoming Highway 345 (WYO 345) is a  east–west Wyoming State Road located in northern Sheridan County.

Route description
Wyoming Highway 345 begins its western end (or northern end at this point) at Montana Secondary Highway 451 at the Montana State Line, approximately 3 miles north of Parkman, Wyoming. For its entire length, WYO 345 parallels the Burlington Northern Santa Fe Railway and to some extent Interstate 90/US Route 87, which lies north of it. Highway 345 travels through the census-designated place (CDP) of Parkman at about 3 miles, as it turns gently southeast. Shortly after, the northern terminus of Wyoming Highway 343, which links to US 14 at Dayton, is met at just under 6 miles. Highway 345 continues eastward toward Ranchester which it reaches nearing 12 miles and US 14 which provides access to exit 9 of Interstate 90. Past Ranchester WYO 345 now closely parallels the interstate in its last stretch. Highway 345 meets Interstate 90/US Route 87/US Route 14 at Milepost 19.27, at the "Acme Interchange," its eastern terminus. The roadway continues east as Acme Road past the interchange to Acme.

History
The entire length of Wyoming Highway 345 was originally designated as US Route 87. This section of US 87 was the last to be decommissioned in favor of the I-90 routing. In March 1985, when I-90 was completed, the Interstate Highway System in Wyoming was completed. At the same time, US 87 was rerouted to Interstate 90 and as a result the former routing through Ranchester became WYO 345.

Major intersections

References

External links 

Wyoming State Routes 300-399
Wyoming Highway 345 - WYO 343 to MT 451/Montana State Line
Wyoming Highway 345 - US 14 to WYO 343
Wyoming Highway 345 - I-90/US-14/US-87 to US-14
Transportation in Sheridan County, Wyoming
345